Charles McEvoy (1879–1929) was a British playwright and stage director. He was originally a journalist before switching to creative writing in 1907, becoming known for his realism. His 1923 play The Likes of Her was adapted into a 1931 film Sally in Our Alley. His brother was the artist Ambrose McEvoy.

He died of cancer in 1929, aged 49. 


Selected works
 David Ballard (1907)
 The Village Wedding (1910) – premiered at McEvoy's theatre in his home village of Aldbourne, Wiltshire with an amateur cast; taken to Manchester but failed in London
 All That Matters (1911, West End)
 The Likes of Her (1923, West End); the 1931 film Sally in Our Alley, starring Gracie Fields, is loosely based on the play

References

Bibliography
 Goble, Alan. The Complete Index to Literary Sources in Film. Walter de Gruyter, 1999.
 Wearing, J.P. The London Stage 1920-1929: A Calendar of Productions, Performers, and Personnel. Rowman & Littlefield, 2014.

External links

1879 births
1929 deaths
British theatre directors
British male dramatists and playwrights
People from London